Glenarm is an unincorporated community in Sangamon County, Illinois, United States. Glenarm is located along Interstate 55, south of Springfield. Glenarm has a post office with ZIP code 62536.

Education
Glenarm is part of the Ball-Chatham School District, which includes Glenwood High School.

References

Unincorporated communities in Sangamon County, Illinois
Unincorporated communities in Illinois
Springfield metropolitan area, Illinois